Földeák is a village in Csongrád county, in the Southern Great Plain region of southern Hungary.

Geography

official homepage: http://www.foldeak.hu

http://foldeak.inf.hu

Populated places in Csongrád-Csanád County